Biefer is a surname. Notable people with the surname include:

 Charles Biefer (1896–?), Swiss water polo player
 Susan Biefer (born 1953), Canadian politician

See also
 Bieber (surname)